Şambayat is a town (belde) and municipality in the Besni District, Adıyaman Province, Turkey. Its population is 3,468 (2021).

References

Towns in Turkey
Populated places in Adıyaman Province
Besni District